In graph theory the Goldberg–Seymour conjecture states that

 

where  is the edge chromatic number of G and

 

Note this above quantity is twice the arboricity of G. It is sometimes called the density of G.

Above G can be a multigraph (can have loops).

Background 
It is already known that for loopless G (but can have parallel edges):

 

When does equality not hold? It does not hold for the Petersen graph. It is hard to find other examples. It is currently unknown whether there are any planar graphs for which equality does not hold.

This conjecture is named after Mark K. Goldberg of Rensselaer Polytechnic Institute and Paul Seymour of Princeton University, who arrived to it independently of Goldberg.

Announced proof 
In 2019, an alleged proof was announced by Chen, Jing, and Zang in the paper. Part of their proof was to find a suitable generalization of Vizing's theorem (which says that for simple graphs ) to multigraphs.

See also 

 Petersen graph#Coloring
 Fractional coloring
 Graph coloring

References 

Graph coloring
Conjectures